Goulburn Valley Suns are a semi-professional association football club based in Shepparton, Victoria. The club was established in 2013 and currently competes in the National Premier Leagues Victoria 2. The Suns' home ground is John McEwen Reserve.

History
2014: For the club's first season of competition, the Suns signed a number of high-profile players, including Simon Colosimo, Naum Sekulovski, Kristian Sarkies and Melbourne City FC youth trio Ersin Kaya, Hernan Espindola and Stipo Andrijasevic. Goulburn Valley Suns lost its first official match, going down 1–0 to Oakleigh Cannons FC at John McEwen Reserve. The Suns would also lose their next five leagues games, before managing their first points and first win in the National Premier Leagues Victoria, when they defeated Werribee City 2–1. GV Suns would finish the season in bottom place, managing 10 points in 26 games. 

2015: As a result of the club's 14th place in 2014, they were relegated to National Premier Leagues Victoria 1, which, for 2015, was separated into an Eastern and Western conference with GVS competing in the Eastern conference. The Suns lost a number of key players, including Colosimo, Sarkies and Ben Clarke. Inconsistent form resulted in the Suns finishing the season in 5th place in the 10-team league. Prolific striker Craig Carley won the NPL Victoria 2 golden boot, scoring 34 goals.

2016: On 2 May 2016, striker Carley left the club to join Hume City. Carley had been the Suns' top goalscorer, with six goals at the time of his departure. The Suns moved quickly to replace Carley, announcing the signing of former Central Coast Mariners player Daniel Heffernan on 21 May 2016. GVS finished the season in 8th place.

2017: The 2017 season saw improved results for Goulburn Valley, who finished in 4th place. 

2018: In 2018, the Suns finished in 5th place with teenager Alou Kuol winning the NPL2 Golden Boot scoring 22 goals in 26 games.

Home ground
The home ground of Goulburn Valley Suns FC is John McEwen Reserve, also known as Shepparton Sports Precinct. It is a $21 million multi-sport facility with four full-size soccer pitches.

Current squad

References

External links
 Official website

Soccer clubs in Victoria (Australia)
National Premier Leagues clubs
Association football clubs established in 2013
2013 establishments in Australia
Shepparton